Hessville is an unincorporated community and census-designated places in Washington Township, Sandusky County, Ohio, United States.

History
Hessville was laid out in 1837 by David Hess, and named for him. A post office called Hessville was established in 1883, and remained in operation until 1903.

References

Populated places in Sandusky County, Ohio
Census-designated places in Sandusky County, Ohio